Sammy Kaye (born Samuel Zarnocay Jr.; March 13, 1910 – June 2, 1987) was an American bandleader and songwriter, whose tag line, "Swing and Sway with Sammy Kaye", became one of the most famous of the Big Band Era. The expression springs from his first hit single in 1937, "Swing and Sway" (U.S. #15). His signature tune was "Harbor Lights", a number-one hit from late 1950.

Biography
Kaye, born in Lakewood, Ohio, United States, graduated from Rocky River High School in Rocky River, Ohio. At Ohio University in Athens, Ohio he was a member of Theta Chi fraternity. Kaye could play the saxophone and the clarinet, but he never featured himself as a soloist on either one.

A leader of one of the so-called "Sweet" bands of the Big Band Era, he made a large number of records for Vocalion Records, RCA Victor, Columbia Records, Bell Records, and the American Decca record label. He was also a hit on radio. Kaye was known for an audience participation gimmick called "So You Want to Lead a Band?" where audience members would be called onto stage in an attempt to conduct the orchestra, with the possibility of winning batons. Kaye was also known for his use of "singing of song titles", which was emulated by Kay Kyser and Blue Barron.

Shortly after the Japanese attack on December 7, 1941, Sammy Kaye wrote the music and Don Reid wrote the words to "Remember Pearl Harbor", the tune of which was based on Ohio University's "Alma Mater". On December 17, 1941, RCA Victor recorded the song, with Sammy Kaye's Swing and Sway Band and The Glee Club.

His band members included Ralph Flanagan. Singers included Don Cornell (not related to Dale Cornell), Billy Williams (the country music singer with the Pecos River Rogues), Tommy Ryan, Gary Willner, Barry Frank, Tony Russo, and Nancy Norman. All members of the band sometimes sang backing vocals in various combination as the "Kaydets". Although his musicians were always competent, the jazz critic George T. Simon described them as "magnificently trained and exceedingly unoriginal".

Television 
Kaye had the following shows on network television:
The Sammy Kaye Show on CBS Television (1951–52)
The Sammy Kaye Show on NBC Television (summer 1953)
So You Want to Lead a Band on ABC Television (1954–55)
Sammy Kaye's Music From Manhattan on ABC (1958–59)

Death 
Kaye died at Valley Hospital in Ridgewood, New Jersey. His body was returned to Lakewood, Ohio and after a Mass at St. Christopher Catholic Church in Rocky River, he was buried in the family plot next to his parents at Lakewood Park Cemetery. Prior to his death in 1987, Sammy Kaye left his orchestra to Roger Thorpe of New Paltz, New York. Thorpe, an accomplished music professor at SUNY Dutchess and director of the Dutchess Jazz Ensemble, knew Sammy from over the years. Thorpe operates the orchestra to this day.

In popular culture

In October 1939, Kaye's "sweet band" sound was satirized by Charlie Barnet and his Orchestra with the song "The Wrong Idea (Swing and Sweat with Charlie Barnet)" written by Charlie Barnet and Billy May.

Discography

Compositions
Sammy Kaye wrote or co-wrote the following songs: "Remember Pearl Harbor", "Until Tomorrow (Goodnight, My Love)", "Belmont Boogie", "Kaye's Melody", "Wanderin'", "I Gotta See a Dream About a Girl", "I Miss Your Kiss" and "Bottoms Up (Let's Have a Ball)" with Sunny Skylar, "The Midnight Ride", and "Hawaiian Sunset". "I Miss Your Kiss" was released as a U.S. War Department V-Disc in May, 1945 as 433A during World War II for American troops overseas.

Filmography
 Song of the Open Road (1944)
 Iceland (1942)

Legacy
Kaye was posthumously inducted into the Big Band and Jazz Hall of Fame in 1992, and for his contribution to the recording industry has a star on the Hollywood Walk of Fame.

See also
"Daddy (Sammy Kaye song)"

References

External links

Official Website
 Sammy Kaye recordings at the Discography of American Historical Recordings.

1910 births
1987 deaths
American bandleaders
American male songwriters
Big band bandleaders
RCA Victor artists
Decca Records artists
Vocalion Records artists
People from Lakewood, Ohio
Ohio University alumni
Deaths from cancer in New Jersey
20th-century American musicians
Songwriters from Ohio
Burials at Lakewood Park Cemetery
20th-century American male musicians
Rocky River High School (Ohio) alumni